Anwara may refer to:

People

Anwara Bahar Chowdhury (1919–1987), Bangladeshi social activist and writer
Anwara Begum (born 1948), Bangladeshi actress
Anwara Begum (academic), Bangladeshi academic
Anwara Syed Haq (born 1949), Bangladeshi writer
Anwara Taimur (born 1936), Indian politician

Other uses
Anwara (film), a 1967 Bangladeshi film 
Anwara Upazila, an administrative unit in Chittagong District, Bangladesh

See also 
 Anwar (disambiguation)